Tboli may refer to:

Tboli people, an indigenous people of South Cotabato, Philippines
Tboli language
Tboli, or T'Boli, a municipality in South Cotabato, Philippines